Germany was represented by mother and daughter duo Maxi and Chris Garden with the song "Lied für einen Freund", at the 1988 Eurovision Song Contest, which took place on 30 April in Dublin. "Lied für einen Freund", written by prolific Eurovision duo Ralph Siegel and Bernd Meinunger, was the winner of the German national final, held on 31 March. Maxi and Chris Garden had finished second in the 1987 German final.

Before Eurovision

Ein Lied für Dublin 
The final took place on 31 March 1988 at the Frankenhalle in Nuremberg, hosted by Jenny Jürgens. Twelve acts presented their entries live and the winner was selected by a panel of approximately 600 people who had been selected as providing a representative cross-section of the German public. Among the other participants was Cindy Berger, who had represented Germany as half of Cindy and Bert in 1974.

One of the songs which failed to qualify for the 1988 German national final, "Das Beste" by male-female duo Duett, later became embroiled in controversy when it was entered by the same performers in the 1990 Austrian selection, which it duly won in dramatic circumstances after the female singer had appeared to faint onstage during the initial performance. When the song's previous history subsequently came to light, Austrian broadcaster ORF had no choice but to disqualify it as a clear violation of Eurovision rules, handing the 1990 Austrian ticket to original runner-up Simone Stelzer.

At Eurovision 
On the night of the final the duo performed 11th in the running order, following Ireland and preceding Austria. At the close of voting, "Lied für einen Freund" had received 48 points, placing Germany 14th of the 21 entries. The German jury awarded its 12 points to contest winners Switzerland.

Voting

References 

1988
Countries in the Eurovision Song Contest 1988
Eurovision